Thailand National Youth Games is the sports event of Thailand at the national level for youth, which is held annually.

Editions

References

External links
Official Website of the 24th National Youth Games in Ubon Ratchathani

1985 establishments in Thailand
National Games, Youth
National multi-sport events
Recurring sporting events established in 1985
National youth sports competitions